The Innes Book of Records is a television show made by the English singer-songwriter Neil Innes. It started in 1979 and ran for three series. Innes released two audio albums, The Innes Book of Records and Off the Record, of songs from the show.

References

External links
BFI listing

Innes media timeline

1970s British comedy television series
1979 British television series debuts
1981 British television series endings
English-language television shows
Works by Neil Innes